Utah Lake State Park is a state park in west Provo, Utah, United States. The park is located at the west end of Provo Center Street on the east shore of Utah Lake (the largest fresh water lake in the state) immediately northwest of the Provo Municipal Airport.

Day visits 
A day-use permit also covers use of boat ramps.

Camping

Lakeshore Campground
 Camping: April 1 – October 31
 Reservations accepted: April 15 – October 15
 Stay limit - 14 days
 Total units - 31
 RV trailer sites - 31
 Maximum RV length - 40 feet
 Tent sites
 Group camping

Utah Lake State Park has 1 loop with 31 sites

Camping amenities 
Campsites can accommodate both back-in and pull-through parking for RVs, and camping spots for tents are available. Each campsite includes running water and electricity (30 amp service), a fire pit with a barbecue grill, and a picnic table. Restroom facilities are shared, as are dumpsters. Free, unisex shower stalls are accessible on the outside of the restrooms.

Disability access 
Wheelchair accessible locations include:
 North jetty – fishing pier
 Campground showers
 Campground restrooms
 Campground roads (asphalt)
 Campground picnic tables (concrete)
 Campground BBQ grill (concrete)
 Campground fire pit (concrete)

For updated information regarding facilities for the physically challenged, contact the park.

References

External links

 

Protected areas established in 1970
Tourist attractions in Provo, Utah
State parks of Utah
Protected areas of Utah County, Utah
1970 establishments in Utah